Abba Bina (died October 2012), best known as Mr. Shit, was a Papua New Guinean businessman and former celebrated political aspirant.

Early and working life
Bina was born in Gembogl in the Eastern Highlands Province. After spending a year studying arts at the University of Papua New Guinea, Bina dropped out and joined the PNG Defence Force. In 1982, Bina served as an aide to PNG Governor-General Tore Lokoloko. After retiring from the military in 1984, he started a business selling Areca nut (buai in Tok Pisin). In 1986, he joined the National Court in the Sheriff's office, eventually becoming the Chief Sheriff. He resigned in 1991.

Business career
Bina began operating a manure business in Port Moresby using the name Mr Shit in the early 1990s, with his slogan "Chicken shit, horse shit, cow shit -- but no bullshit" on his business card.

Political aspirant
Bina ran for the National Parliament of Papua New Guinea during the 1997 election. He was denied permission to use the name "Mr Shit", a factor used to explain his poor showing in the election.

In 2000 Bina was included in the documentary The Big Picture: Paradise Imperfect. Bina died in 2012 in Port Moresby from undisclosed causes.

Death
Bina died in October 2012 and was buried in his home village in the Eastern Highlands.

References

2012 deaths
Year of birth missing
Papua New Guinean politicians
People from the National Capital District (Papua New Guinea)